Mathias Rust (born 1 June 1968) is a German aviator known for his flight that ended with a landing near Red Square in Moscow on 28 May 1987. A teenage amateur pilot, he flew from Helsinki, Finland, to Moscow, being tracked several times by Soviet Air Defence Forces and civilian air traffic controllers, as well as Soviet Air Force interceptor aircraft. The Soviet fighters did not receive permission to shoot him down, and his aeroplane was mistaken for a friendly aircraft several times. He landed on Bolshoy Moskvoretsky Bridge, next to Red Square near the Kremlin in the capital of the Soviet Union.

Rust said he wanted to create an "imaginary bridge" to the East, and that his flight was intended to reduce tension and suspicion between the two Cold War sides.

Rust's flight through a supposedly impenetrable air defence system had a great effect on the Soviet military and led to the dismissal of many senior officers, including Minister of Defence Marshal of the Soviet Union Sergei Sokolov and the Commander-in-Chief of the Soviet Air Defence Forces, former World War II fighter ace pilot Chief Marshal Alexander Koldunov. The incident aided Mikhail Gorbachev in the implementation of his reforms, by allowing him to dismiss numerous military officials opposed to his policies. Rust was sentenced to four years in a general-regime labour camp for violation of border crossing and air traffic regulations, and for provoking an emergency situation upon his landing. After 14 months in prison, he was pardoned by Andrei Gromyko, the Chairman of the Presidium of the Supreme Soviet, and released.

Flight profile

Rust, aged 18, was an inexperienced pilot, with about 50 hours of flying experience at the time of his flight. On 13 May 1987, Rust left Uetersen near Hamburg and his home town Wedel in his rented Reims Cessna F172P, registration D-ECJB, which was modified by removing some of the seats and replacing them with auxiliary fuel tanks. He spent the next two weeks travelling across northern Europe, visiting the Faroe islands, spending a week in Iceland, and then visiting Bergen on his way back. He was later quoted as saying that he had the idea of attempting to reach Moscow even before the departure, and he saw the trip to Iceland (where he visited Hofdi House, the site of unsuccessful talks between the United States and the Soviet Union in October 1986) as a way to test his piloting skills.

On 28 May 1987, Rust refuelled at Helsinki-Malmi Airport. He told air traffic control that he was going to Stockholm, and took off at 12:21. Immediately after his final communication with traffic control, he turned his plane to the east near Nummela, Vihti. Air traffic controllers tried to contact him as he was moving around the busy Helsinki–Moscow route, but Rust turned off all his communications equipment.

Rust disappeared from the Finnish air traffic radar near Espoo. Control personnel presumed an emergency and a rescue effort was organized, including a Finnish Border Guard patrol boat. They found an oil patch near Sipoo where Rust had disappeared from radar observation, and conducted an underwater search but did not find anything.

Rust crossed the Baltic coastline over Estonia and turned towards Moscow. At 14:29 he appeared on Soviet Air Defence Forces (PVO) radar and, after failure to reply to an IFF signal, was assigned combat number 8255. Three SAM battalions of 54th Air Defence Corps tracked him for some time, but failed to obtain permission to launch missiles at him. All air defences were brought to readiness and two interceptors were sent to investigate. At 14:48, near Gdov, MiG-23 pilot Senior Lieutenant A. Puchnin observed a white sport plane similar to a Yakovlev Yak-12 and asked for permission to engage, but was denied.

The fighters lost contact with Rust soon after this. While they were being directed back to him, he disappeared from radar near Staraya Russa. West German magazine Bunte speculated that he might have landed there for some time, noting that he changed his clothes during his flight and that he took too much time to fly to Moscow considering his plane's speed and the weather conditions.

Air defence re-established contact with Rust's plane several times but confusion followed all of these events. The PVO system had shortly before been divided into several districts, which simplified management but created additional overhead for tracking officers at the districts' borders. The local air regiment near Pskov was on maneuvers and, due to inexperienced pilots' tendency to forget correct IFF designator settings, local control officers assigned all traffic in the area friendly status, including Rust.

Near Torzhok there was a similar situation, as increased air traffic was created by a rescue effort for an air crash the previous day. Rust, flying a slow propeller-driven aircraft, was confused with one of the helicopters taking part in the rescue. He was spotted several more times and given false friendly recognition twice. Rust was considered as a domestic training plane defying regulations, and was assigned the least priority by air defense.

Around 19:00, Rust appeared above Moscow. He had initially intended to land in the Kremlin, but he reasoned that landing inside, hidden by the Kremlin walls, would have allowed the KGB to arrest him and deny the incident. Therefore, he changed his landing spot to Red Square. Heavy pedestrian traffic did not allow him to land there either, so after circling about the square one more time, he was able to land on Bolshoy Moskvoretsky Bridge by St. Basil's Cathedral. A later inquiry found that trolleybus wires normally strung over the bridge—which would have  prevented his landing there—had been removed for maintenance that morning, and were replaced the next day. When asked where he was from, he replied "Germany" making the bystanders think he was from East Germany; but when he said West Germany, they were surprised. A British doctor videotaped Rust circling over Red Square and landing on the bridge. Rust was arrested two hours later.

Aftermath

Rust's trial began in Moscow on 2 September 1987. He was sentenced to four years in a general-regime labour camp for hooliganism, for disregard of aviation laws, and for breaching the Soviet border. He was never transferred to a labour camp, and instead served his time at the high security Lefortovo temporary detention facility in Moscow. Two months later, Reagan and Gorbachev agreed to sign a treaty to eliminate intermediate-range nuclear weapons in Europe, and the Supreme Soviet ordered Rust to be released in August 1988 as a goodwill gesture to the West.

Rust's return to Germany on 3 August 1988 was accompanied by huge media attention, but he did not talk to the assembled journalists; his family had sold the exclusive rights to the story to the German magazine Stern for 100,000 DM. He reported that he had been treated well in the Soviet prison. Journalists described him as "psychologically unstable and unworldly in a dangerous manner".

William E. Odom, former director of the U.S. National Security Agency and author of The Collapse of the Soviet Military, says that Rust's flight irreparably damaged the reputation of the Soviet military. This enabled Gorbachev to remove many of the strongest opponents to his reforms. Minister of Defence Sergei Sokolov and the head of the Soviet Air Defence Forces Alexander Koldunov were dismissed along with hundreds of other officers. This was the biggest turnover in the Soviet military since Stalin's purges 50 years earlier.

Rust's rented Reims Cessna F172P (serial #F17202087), registered D-ECJB, was sold to Japan where it was exhibited for several years. In 2008 it was returned to Germany and was placed in the Deutsches Technikmuseum in Berlin.

Because Rust's flight seemed like a blow to the authority of the Soviet regime, it was the source of numerous jokes and urban legends. For a while after the incident, Red Square was jokingly referred to by Muscovites as Sheremetyevo-3 (Sheremetyevo-1 and -2 being the two terminals at Moscow's international airport).  At the end of 1987, the police radio code used by law enforcement officers in Moscow was allegedly updated to include a code for an aircraft landing.

In Estonia at Saka Manor Park there is a monument dedicated to Rust's flight.

Later life
While doing his obligatory community service (Zivildienst) in a West German hospital in 1989, Rust stabbed a female co-worker who had rejected him. The victim barely survived. He was convicted of injuring her and sentenced to two and a half years in prison, but was released after 15 months. Since then he has lived a fragmented life, describing himself as a "bit of an oddball". After being released from court, he converted to Hinduism in 1996 to become engaged to a daughter of an Indian tea merchant. In 2001, he was convicted of stealing a cashmere pullover and ordered to pay a fine of 10,000 DM, which was later reduced to 600 DM. A further brush with the law came in 2005, when he was convicted of fraud and had to pay a €1,500 fine.  In 2009 Rust described himself as a professional poker player. Most recently, in 2012, he described himself as an analyst at a Zurich-based investment bank.

Peace activism 
In October 2015, The Hindu published an interview with Rust to mark the 25th anniversary of German reunification. Rust opined that institutional failures in Western countries to preserve moral standards and uphold the primacy of democratic ideals were creating mistrust between peoples and governments. Pointing to the genesis of a New Cold War between Russia and the Western powers, Rust suggested that India should tread with caution and avoid entanglement: "India will be better served if it follows a policy of neutrality while interacting with EU member countries as the big European powers at present are following the foreign policy of the U.S. unquestioningly". He claimed: "Governments have been dominated by the corporate entities and citizens have ceased to matter in public policy".

In the media
Following the 20th anniversary of his flight on 28 May 2007, the international media interviewed Rust about the flight and its aftermath.

The Washington Post and Bild both have online editions of their interviews. The most comprehensive televised interview available online is produced by the Danish Broadcasting Corporation. In their interview Rust in Red Square, recorded in May 2007, Rust gives a full account of the flight in English.

References

External links

 Excerpts of video capturing Rust's flying and landing in Moscow
 Rust in Red Square  (English) about the flight and the aftermath. Interview clips are embedded in a flash presentation. (October 2007)
 TV Interview 2007 on YouTube English interview in Danish news cast eng/eng subs (28 May 2007)
 Smithsonian's Air & Space Magazine: "The Notorious Flight of Mathias Rust" Comprehensive article about the flight and the political aftermath in Gorbachev's USSR (1 July 2005)
 Guardian: interview with Mathias Rust
 Where Are They Now?: Mathias Rust
 The Cessna, registration number D-ECJB on display Deutsches Technikmuseum, Berlin
 Novaya Gazeta: РУСТ – ЭТО ПО-НАШЕМУ
 Washington Post: A Dubious Diplomat Washington Post article on Rust incident, aftermath, and Rust's life today.  (27 May 2007)
  Mathias Rust, fly to the heart of USSR, by Jose Antonio Lozano 
 Danmarks Radio – "Rust in Red Square" interview, May 2007 
 
 BBC article including original video of the landing.
 Mathias Rust Interview from the Love + Radio podcast

1968 births
1987 in international relations
1987 in the Soviet Union
1980s in Moscow
1980s trials
20th-century German criminals
Living people
Aviation accidents and incidents in 1987
Aviation accidents and incidents in Russia
Aviation accidents and incidents in the Soviet Union
Cold War history of Germany
Converts to Hinduism
Criminals from Schleswig-Holstein
German aviators
German Hindus
German male criminals
German prisoners and detainees
Inmates of Lefortovo Prison
People from Wedel
Prisoners and detainees of Germany
Prisoners and detainees of the Soviet Union
Soviet Union–West Germany relations
Violations of Soviet airspace